Offshore powerboat racing is a type of racing by ocean-going powerboats, typically point-to-point racing.

In most of the world, offshore powerboat racing is led by the Union Internationale Motonautique (UIM) regulated Class 1 and Powerboat P1. In the US, offshore powerboat racing is led by the APBA/UIM and consists of races hosted by Powerboat P1 USA.

The sport is financed by a mixture of private funding and commercial sponsors.

History of the sport

In 1903, the Automobile Club of Great Britain and Ireland, and its offshoot, the Marine Motor Association organised a race of auto-boats. The winner was awarded the Harmsworth Trophy. Offshore powerboat racing was first recognised as a sport when, in 1904, a race took place from the south-eastern coast England to Calais, France. In the United States, the APBA (American Power Boat Association) was formed soon thereafter and the first U.S. recorded race was in 1911, in California.

The sport increased in popularity over the next few years in the United States, with 10 races being scheduled during the 1917 season. The sport's growth was disrupted in Europe during World War I.

Over the period of 1927–35 there was a huge interest in power boat racing in Europe both on sea water and on freshwater rivers and lakes. These boats which were described as hydroplanes were powered by Evinrude, Elto, Johnson, Lockwood, and Watermota outboard engines.
The sport entered the modern era in the 1960s, with notable names like Jim Wynn, Don Aronow, and Dick Bertram competing in events such as the Bahamas  race. During that time, the 'navigator' position in the raceboat was extremely important (unlike in today's small, track-like circuits), as finding small checkpoints over a hundred-mile open ocean run was a difficult endeavour.

Modern races are short, track style events with much improved viewing for the spectators, and the different categories of boats have multiplied far beyond the 4 classes that were common through much of the 1960s, '70s, and '80s.

In recent years the biggest number of entries in Offshore races have been for the Cowes – Torquay – Cowes and Cowes – Poole – Cowes races held by the British Offshore Powerboat Race Club.

Offshore Race Series

UIM Class One World Powerboat Championship

Class 1 World Powerboat Championship.
The technology of Class 1 has advanced considerably since the class was first sanctioned by the U.I.M. in 1964. Shortly after its advent, Americans Jim Wynne, Dick Bertram and Don Aronow supported technological advancement, with Daytona, Mercruiser, and AeroMarine. In the 1980s European design became more prominent. Don Shead's Aluminium monohulls, Italian manufacturers Picchiotti and CUV, and the James Beard-Clive Curtis Cougar catamarans set the record. Fabio Buzzi made a large technological advance by introduing glass-reinforced polymer hulls, turbo-charged engines, and integral surface drives and the 90's subsequently saw the emergence of Michael Peter's design and Tencara and Victory hulls dominate, with Sterling, Lamborghini, Seatek and more recently, Mercury sharing the power battle.

Weighing around five tonnes, each boat in the Class 1 fleet is approximately 12-14m in length, 3.5m wide, and constructed using composite materials. All the boats were catamarans until 2019, when monohulls were permitted again.

Venture Cup
In 2012, it was announced that a new series of 'ultra-marathon' offshore races would be run every two years under the title of the Venture Cup. The first race was scheduled to take place in June 2013 from Cowes in the UK to Monte Carlo; many consider the 1972 London to Monte Carlo race to have been the greatest powerboat race ever. The Venture Cup is billed as the World's longest, toughest and most prestigious powerboat race. The 2013 race was however cancelled because of lack of funding and replaced by a Prologue.

In 2015 the Venture Offshore Cup was announced. The race was to be run around the entire coast of Ireland, beginning in Cork and ending in Dublin with multiple stops en route. However, in May 2016 the organisers cancelled the race again.

P1 SuperStock Championship

P1 SuperStock is a single class powerboat race series.  It has international recognition and guaranteed media exposure and is broadcast on TV. P1 SuperStock is approved by the sport's governing body, the Union Internationale Motonautique (UIM), as an international class of powerboat racing.

P1 SuperStock is a major sporting festival over five or six weekends in May through October. There are up to six races over the race weekend, lasting 30–45 minutes each. The free events attract thousands of spectators and often run alongside the AquaX jetski series. All teams race in P1 Panther race boats with 250HP outboard engines.

Powerboat P1 Management Ltd is the rights-holder for Class 1, P1 SuperStock and also owns the rights to Powerboat P1 World Championship and P1 AquaX. In the US, a wholly owned subsidiary, Powerboat P1 USA, manages all aspects of Offshore racing throughout North America.

Boats in the 250+ hp class are  sport racers powered by a 250+ hp engine.

UIM Powerboat GPS World Championship
The series was officially founded as Powerboat P1 World Championship in May 2003 in Nettuno, Italy. Twelve boats, the majority of which were Italian, raced in the first-ever Grand Prix of the Sea. Starting out with 15-year-old aluminium boats, Powerboat P1 boats evolved dramatically through the decade to the point where the mono-hull twin-engine boats were developing around 1800 hp. During the Powerboat P1 World Championship era, which spanned 2003 to 2009, there was 40% more horsepower on a P1 starting grid than Formula 1.

Notable offshore powerboat races

Cowes Torquay Cowes
The Cowes-Torquay was launched by Sir Max Aitken, 2nd Baronet, as the first Offshore Powerboat race in Europe in 1961.

It is the longest-running offshore powerboat race in the world.

Initially sponsored by the Daily Express newspaper, its success encouraged several countries in Europe and the Middle East to follow suit. Hence it can rightly claim to have introduced offshore powerboat racing to the rest of the world outside the United States where the modern sport was launched with the first Miami-Nassau Race in 1956.

In 1964, the Union Internationale Motonautique, the world governing authority for powerboat racing, introduced the World Championship and a Sam Griffith Memorial Trophy, a memorial to Sam Griffith, the American founder of modern offshore racing.

In order to qualify as a championship heat, the race format was therefore changed and instead of finishing at Tor-quay, the fleet returned to Cowes, a pattern that remains to this day.

The race is organised by the British Powerboat Racing Club.

Event Director Martin Levi, son of powerboat designer, Sonny Levi took over the running of the event in 2016.

The Round Britain Powerboat Race 
The Round Britain Powerboat has been run on 3 previous occasions.
Winner 1969: Timo Mäkinen – Avenger Too
Winner 1984: Fabio Buzzi – White Iveco
Winner 2008: Pateras Vassilis – Blue FPT

1969 Daily Telegraph – B.P. Round Britain Powerboat Race 
1459 miles, divided into 10 racing stages and one slow cruise; flat calm seas under blazing skies, a thick pea-souper fog, and a rough coastal run; 42 assorted boats ranging in power from 100 hp to 1,000 hp.

The most outstanding feature of this marathon race was undoubtedly the freak weather, it was called by most participants, for the first 700 miles to Oban the conditions were as near perfect as they could be, and the fog on the Inverness-Dundee run, and the rough seas of the Dundee-Whitby leg were greeted almost with glee.

Avenger Too, crewed by Timo Mäkinen, Pascoe Watson and Brian Hendicott, the Round Britain race was a success story from start to finish. They won the first leg to Falmouth and the second leg to Milford Haven; on the run to Douglas they were third, but still retained their overall lead. Only once during the entire race were they pushed from that leading position, and they had such a handsome lead that they could afford to tuck in behind a slower radar-equipped boat on the foggy run to Dundee, and still emerge the leaders by two hours.

Their final victory, in a total time of just over 39 hours, represented an average speed, sustained over 1,381 nautical miles of racing, of 37.1 knots.

The Cornish '100'  
A Class 3, Offshore, open Cockpit race, held between 1964 and 1968. The course ran between Falmouth and Plymouth. In the 1966 race only four of eighteen boats finished the course. Originally, the course started at Black Rock, Falmouth, to Plymouth and back with marks at the Manacles rock and Looe Island. From 1967, the course started in Plymouth. It was a straight run from Plymouth to the Black Rock, Falmouth, and then a return to Plymouth, an approximate distance of 100 miles. Notable winners include Tommy Sopwith in 1965 and Fiona Gore in 1968.

1984 Everest Double Glazing – Round Britain Powerboat Race 
Once again the course for this great race was going to imitate the 1969 version. Organised by ex Powerboat Racer Tim Powell and after two years in concept and design Tim managed to obtain sponsorship from Everest Double Glazing which ensured the success of the race. With famous racers such as Fabio Buzzi, Lady Arran, Colin Gervase-Brazier, Peter Armstrong, Ted Toleman and Renato DelaValle and many others the fleet set off on 14 July 1984, once again from Portsmouth on its 1,400 journey around the British Isles.

The two main contenders were Buzzi cruiser-based White Iveco, raced by company owner Fabio Buzzi, and Renato della Valle's Ego Lamborghini. White Iveco was a single-step monohull powered by four Iveco diesels, while Ego was a Don Shead designed 38 ft (11.6 m) hull powered by a pair of 7-litre, marinised V12 Lamborghini petrol engines. Weather conditions for the first leg were poor and of the 28 starters at Portsmouth, only 18 boats reached Falmouth. By the end of the second leg only 12 remained. By the halfway stage, White Iveco led on elapsed time with Ego Lamborghini behind.

British hopes lay in the hands of Double Two Shirts, a 40 ft (12.1 m) Shead-designed, Planatec-built racer with Sabre Diesel power, lying two hours back. An indication of the performance of these powerboats can be gauged from the Dundee to Whitby leg. Over a distance of 157 miles White Iveco averaged 69 knots, though Buzzi dismissed this with a typical Italian shrug saying, "In Italy this is just a cruising boat." However, at Ramsgate, while White Iveco was being craned out of the water for an overhaul she slipped from her cradle, landed on a bollard and gashed her hull. A feverish 36 hours followed while repairs were made so that she could complete the final leg. At the finish she was in first place with Colin Gervase-Braziers "The Legend" second and Ego Lamborghini third.

Significantly, Motorboats and Yachting commented that the number of retirements demonstrated that though undoubtedly fast, some Class I craft had proved themselves to be unsafe in anything other than calm waters.

The Fiat Powertrain 2008 Round Britain Powerboat Race 
After a period of 24 years another ex-powerboat racer and businessman now retired, Mike Lloyd, made the decision in 2006 that this great race should be brought back to life. He and his small team, including Peter Myles, fought for two years to ensure it did take place. Supported by 47 competitors and the Fiat Powertrain the fleet eventually left once again from the premises of Gunwharf Quays in Portsmouth at 09.30am on 21 June 2008 on this ten-leg twelve-day race.

Fabio Buzzi had decided to take part in his old but famous four engined Red FPT as had the famous racer Hannes Bohinc in Wettpunkt. There was a strong contingent of three boats from Goldfish of Norway and competitors from Sweden, Greece, Germany, Scotland and Ireland.

As in the previous races the weather at the start was awful and once the fleet of 47 boats had negotiated the many excited support boats within the Solent and entered the serious seas off the Needles the fleet knew they were in for a tough leg. Before reaching the Solent Fabio Buzzi retired with damaged drives and the infamous Lyme Bay between Portland Bill and Torquay took out several more including Wettpunkt and also the German owned and driven Blue Marlin which actually sank in Lyme Bay in 50 metres of water. All crew however were rescued and returned to land safe. The leg to Plymouth was won by a British crew Silverline (owned and driven by famous offshore racer Drew Langdon and Miles Jennings) with the Norwegians "Lionhead" second and the surprise of the day the Greek boat Blue FPT third. The 2nd leg next day had to be cancelled because of huge seas in the Bristol Channel so the Fleet made its way by road to Milford Haven in South Wales to be ready for their run to Northern Ireland the following day.

The Round Britain Powerboat Race is the last remaining long distance offshore powerboat race of beyond 1,000 miles anywhere in the world and is a real test of strength, determination, speed and shows how the best results can be reached by boats that are well built, able to maintain consistently high performance levels, thanks to the reliability of their technical equipment.

The Needles Trophy
The Needles Trophy was first presented in 1932 and every year until 1938. A break until 1951, 1952, 1954, 1956. Then another break until 1967 until 1989 inclusive.

See also
F1 Powerboat World Championship
Inshore powerboat racing
Offshore Super Series

References

External links
"Mile-A-Minute, Thrills of the Water" Popular Mechanics, May 1935 pp. 680-682
"Speed Boating on a Desert Sea" Popular Mechanics, July 1935
Powerboat Racing World
Powerboat GPS World Championship

Motorboat racing
Former Summer Olympic sports